Del Rey Books is a branch of Ballantine Books, which is owned by Random House and, in turn, by Penguin Random House.  It is a separate imprint established in 1977 under the editorship of author Lester del Rey and his wife Judy-Lynn del Rey.  It specializes in science fiction and fantasy books, and formerly manga under its (now defunct) Del Rey Manga imprint.

The first new novel published by Del Rey was The Sword of Shannara by Terry Brooks in 1977. Del Rey also publishes the Star Wars novels under the LucasBooks sub-imprint (licensed from Lucasfilm, a subsidiary of The Walt Disney Studios division of The Walt Disney Company).

Authors

Piers Anthony
Isaac Asimov
Stephen Baxter
Amber Benson
Ray Bradbury
Terry Brooks
Pierce Brown
Bonnie Burton
Jack L. Chalker
Arthur C. Clarke
James Clemens
Dan Cragg
Brian Daley
Maurice G. Dantec
Philip K. Dick
Stephen R. Donaldson
David Eddings
Philip José Farmer
Mick Farren
Joe Clifford Faust
Lynn Flewelling
Robert L. Forward
Alan Dean Foster
Gregory Frost
Christopher Golden
James L. Halperin
Barbara Hambly
Peter F. Hamilton
Ward Hawkins
Kevin Hearne
Robert A. Heinlein
Robert E. Howard
Robert Don Hughes
J. Gregory Keyes
Rosemary Kirstein
Katherine Kurtz
H. P. Lovecraft
James Luceno
Anne McCaffrey
Donald E. McQuinn
China Miéville
Elizabeth Moon
Sylvain Neuvel
Robert Newcomb
Larry Niven
John Norman
Naomi Novik
Frederik Pohl
Michael Poore
Christopher Rowley
David Sherman
Scott Sigler
Lucy A. Snyder
Michael J. Sullivan
J. R. R. Tolkien
Harry Turtledove

Books published 

2020
 A Blight of Blackwings
 Devolution
 Ink and Sigil
 Mexican Gothic

Series

Batman
 A trilogy based on the Dark Knight version of the character.
 Batman: Dead White (2006 novel) by John Shirley
 Batman: Inferno (2006 novel) by Alex Irvine
 Batman: Fear Itself (2007 novel) by Michael Reaves and Steven-Elliot Altman

Dragonriders of Pern
Twenty-three Dragonriders of Pern novels by Anne McCaffrey and Todd McCaffrey beginning with the first edition of the third novel—The White Dragon (1978)—and reprints of the first two novels.

Ghosts of Albion
 Accursed (2005 novel) by Amber Benson and Christopher Golden
 Witchery (2006 novel) by Amber Benson and Christopher Golden

God of War
 God of War (2010 novelization) by Matthew Stover and Robert E. Vardeman
 God of War II (2013 novelization) by Robert E. Vardeman

Halo
 Halo: The Fall of Reach (2001 novel) by Eric Nylund
 Halo: The Flood (2003 novel) by William C. Dietz
 Halo: First Strike (2003 novel) by Eric Nylund
Ink & Sigil by Kevin Hearne

 Ink & Sigil (2020 novel)
 Paper & Blood (2021 novel)
Robotech
 Twenty-one Robotech novels (1987–1996) by James Luceno and Brian Daley

Shannara
Eleven (and counting) Shannara novels by Terry Brooks

Spider-Man by Peter David
 Spider-Man (2002 novelization) by Peter David
 Spider-Man 2 (2004 novelization) by Peter David
 Spider-Man 3 (2007 novelization) by Peter David

Southern Victory
 Eleven Southern Victory novels (1997–2007) by Harry Turtledove

Star Wars
 Many Star Wars novels by various authors.

Tarzan
 Time's Last Gift (1977 revised edition) by Philip José Farmer
 Tarzan: The Epic Adventures (1996) by R. A. Salvatore
 The Dark Heart of Time (June 1999) by Philip José Farmer
Temeraire

Nine Temeraire novels (2006-2016) by Naomi Novik, published by Del Rey books in the US.
X-Men
 X-Men (2000 novelization) by Kristine Kathryn Rusch and Dean Wesley Smith
 X-Men 2 (2003 novelization) by Chris Claremont
 X-Men: The Last Stand (2006 novelization) by Chris Claremont

References

External links
Del Rey on Random House Books

American speculative fiction publishers
Science fiction publishers
Fantasy book publishers
Random House
Publishing companies established in 1977